Abdul Mubin Sheppard , born Mervyn Cecil ffrank Sheppard, pen name M. C. ff Sheppard, (21 June 1905 – 11 September 1994) was a Malaysian World War II veteran and prisoner of war, as well as a renowned historian and academician.

Life

Early life 
Mervyn Sheppard was born in Ireland on June 21, 1905. He received his early education at Marlborough College before continuing on to Cambridge University. He joined the Malayan Civil Services (MCS) in 1928, a year after passing his qualification exam in London. During his time there, he developed a strong attachment to the country and its people. He married Rosemary Oakeley in Singapore's St Andrew's Cathedral on 27 January 1939. Lavender, their daughter and his only child, was born in October 1941. Their union lasted until their deaths.

World War II 
From 1941 to 1942, he served as a Company Commander in the 1st Battalion, Federated Malay States Volunteer Force (FMSVF), earning the rank of captain and becoming a prisoner of war during WWII. In 1945, he retired as a major from the FMSVF.

Post-WWII 
He chose to remain in the civil service until his total retirement in 1963. He converted to Islam in 1957, adopting the name Abdul Mubin Sheppard and performing the Hajj.

In 1957, he was appointed as the first Keeper of Public Records, an office that would eventually become the Arkib Negara, or National Archives. One year later, he became the first director of the then-Federation of Malaya's own national museum, where he assembled a team tasked with retrieving Malayan artefacts from cities such as Lisbon and London to be displayed there.

He also a founder of Malayan Film Unit (now known as Filem Negara Malaysia) when it was established in 1946.

Death 
He died on 11 September 1994 at the Subang Jaya Medical Centre in Subang Jaya, Selangor. He was buried in Jalan Ampang Muslim Cemetery with military traditions and national honours.

Careers 
Sheppard's careers include:

 Malayan Civil Services Intern (February 1942–September 1945)
 Director of Public Relations (1946–1947)
 Kelantan's Acting British Adviser (1950–1951)
 Negeri Sembilan's British Adviser (1951–1956)
 Federal Chief Examiner for Bahasa Melayu (1951–1957)
 Head of Emergency Food Denial Organisation (1956–1957)
 Keeper of Public Records (1957–1961)
 Director of Museum, Federation of Malaya (1958–1963)

Among his other positions are:

 Founder of the Malaysian Federation of Arts Councils
 Vice President of Malaysian Branch of the Royal Asiatic Society
 Malayan Historical Society's Honorary Editor
 Malaya Muslim Warfare Organisation's Honorary Secretary General
 Honorary Treasurer of the National Art Gallery's Board of Trustees

Legacy 
The Mubin Sheppard Memorial Prize was established under his name in 1996 by the Malaysia Heritage Trust to stimulate students' awareness of "the need to conserve Malaysia's built heritage and to encourage research and writings on various aspects of conservation and preservation".

He was the founding father of the Malaya Association of Youth Clubs (EST. 1954), a youth association inspired by the National Association of Boys' Club.

Honours
Among the honours and awards he has received including:

Honours of the United Kingdom 

  : 
 Member of the Order of the British Empire (MBE) (1946)

Honours of Malaysia

Federal honours 
  : 
 Companion of the Order of the Defender of the Realm (JMN) (1963)
  Commander of the Order of Loyalty to the Crown of Malaysia (PSM) - Tan Sri (1969)

Malaysian State honours 

  Negeri Sembilan
 He was awarded a title of Dato' Jasa Purba Diraja by the Yang di-Pertuan Besar of Negeri Sembilan for his services as a historian. - Dato'
  :
  Knight Commander of the Order of the Crown of Selangor (DPMS) – Dato' (1982)

Bibliography
His works include:

Tunku Abdul Rahman; Father of Independence 1957–1970
The Adventures of Hang Tuah (1949)
A Short History of Terengganu (1949)
A Short History of Malaya (1953)
Taman Indera: A Royal Pleasure Ground. Malay Decorative Arts and Pastimes (1972) 
The Malay Regiment 1933–1947 (1978)
Living Crafts of Malaysia (1978)
Taman budiman: Memoirs of an unorthodox civil servant (1979)
Singapore 150 Years (1982) 
Tunku, a pictorial biography, 1903–1957 (1984)

References

1905 births
1994 deaths
Converts to Islam
Malaysian Muslims
20th-century Malaysian historians
Malaysian people of Irish descent
Malaysian curators
Archivists
Companions of the Order of the Defender of the Realm
Commanders of the Order of Loyalty to the Crown of Malaysia
People educated at Marlborough College
Administrators in British Malaya
British emigrants to Malaysia
Knights Commander of the Order of the Crown of Selangor